Chryseomicrobium palamuruense is a Gram-positive, rod-shaped, haloalkalitolerant and motile bacterium from the genus of Chryseomicrobium which has been isolated from a drainage near a hostel of the Palamuru University in India.

References

External links
Type strain of Chryseomicrobium palamuruense at BacDive -  the Bacterial Diversity Metadatabase

Bacillales
Bacteria described in 2016